Clarisse Machanguana (born 4 October 1976) is a  professional women's basketball player and philanthropist from Mozambique. She has played internationally in both the United States (WNBA from 1999 to 2002) and in Spain (FC Barcelona since 2003). She also represented Mozambique at the 2006 Lusophony Games in Macau, China. In 2014 founded the Clarisse Machanguana Foundation, which empowers Mozambiquan youth through sport, education and health. Machanguana was the UNICEF ambassador to Mozambique from 2016 to 2018.

Early life and college
Machanguana was born on October 4, 1976, in Mozambique. When she was 19, she moved to Portugal to attend preparatory school and play basketball. She then followed her friend, Portuguese basketball player Ticha Penicheiro, to Old Dominion University. In 1997, Machanguana and Penicheiro led the Lady Monarchs to the NCAA title game.

Old Dominion University statistics
Source

WNBA career
Machanguana was drafted in the 2nd round (16th overall) in the 1999 WNBA Draft by the Los Angeles Sparks. She played collegiately at Old Dominion University. In 1997, Machanguana was named to the Final Four All Tournament team. With the Sparks, she played in 59 games in 2 seasons, starting 1 and averaging 3.1 points per game. In 2001, Machanguana played with the Charlotte Sting, where she played in 30 games, starting 8 and averaging 5.4 points per game. In her final season in the WNBA, Machanguana played with the Orlando Miracle. In Orlando, Machanguana played in 29 games, starting 25 of them. She also averaged 4.8 points per game.

Post-WNBA 
Since leaving the WNBA after the 2002 season, Machanguana joined F.C. Barcelona in Spain. At the 2006 Lusophony Games, she led the Mozambique women's national basketball team to a gold medal.

In 2006, Machanguana was inducted into Old Dominion University's Hall of Fame.

Non-Profit Work 
After retiring from playing basketball, Machanguana returned to Mozambique. Local nonprofits approached her to represent them due to her name recognition and wide reach. Through this work, she learned more about the HIV epidemic in Mozambique. 

In 2014, founded the Fundação Clarisse Machanguana (Clarisse Machanguana Foundation), which empowers Mozambiquan youth through sport, education and health. This program  From May 2016 to May 2018, Machanguana was appointed UNICEF ambassador to Mozambique in recognition of her commitment to child rights, girls empowerment, and adolescent empowerment. 

In spring 2016, she began a trek across Mozambique to bring awareness to the country's HIV epidemic and  obstetric fistula.

During the COVID-19 pandemic, Machanguana approached the U.S. Embassy in Mozambique for aid in obtaining a scholarship to learn about nonprofit management. She was awarded a scholarship through the Fulbright Program. In 2022, she graduated from the University of Arizona with a master’s degree in global nonprofit management.

Career statistics

Regular season

|-
| style="text-align:left;"|1999
| style="text-align:left;"|Los Angeles
| 28 || 0 || 8.8 || .490 || .000 || .722 || 1.9 || 0.3 || 0.3 || 0.1 || 0.5 || 2.6
|-
| style="text-align:left;"|2000
| style="text-align:left;"|Los Angeles
| 31 || 1 || 13.6 || .578 || .000 || .560 || 2.3 || 0.6 || 0.4 || 0.1 || 0.6 || 3.5
|-
| style="text-align:left;"|2001
| style="text-align:left;"|Charlotte
| 30 || 8 || 19.3 || .500 || .000 || .649 || 4.0 || 0.6 || 0.5 || 0.5 || 1.4 || 5.4
|-
| style="text-align:left;"|2002
| style="text-align:left;"|Orlando
| 29 || 25 || 14.8 || .535 || .000 || .640 || 2.2 || 0.6 || 0.4 || 0.1 || 1.1 || 4.8
|-
| style="text-align:left;"|Career
| style="text-align:left;"|4 years, 3 teams
| 118 || 34 || 14.2 || .527 || .000 || .650 || 2.6 || 0.5 || 0.4 || 0.2 || 0.9 || 4.1

Playoffs

|-
| style="text-align:left;"|1999
| style="text-align:left;"|Los Angeles
| 1 || 0 || 7.0 || .667 || .000 || .000 || 2.0 || 0.0 || 0.0 || 0.0 || 0.0 || 4.0
|-
| style="text-align:left;"|2000
| style="text-align:left;"|Los Angeles
| 4 || 0 || 11.8 || .500 || .000 || .667 || 2.8 || 0.0 || 0.3 || 0.3 || 0.3 || 3.0
|-
| style="text-align:left;"|2001
| style="text-align:left;"|Charlotte
| 8 || 0 || 16.5 || .531 || — || .667 || 2.4 || 0.3 || 0.4 || 0.4 || 0.8 || 4.8
|-
| style="text-align:left;"|Career
| style="text-align:left;"|3 years, 2 teams
| 13 || 0 || 14.3 || .535 || .000 || .667 || 2.5 || 0.2 || 0.3 || 0.3 || 0.5 || 4.2

Sources

 Player profile at wnba.com

1976 births
Living people
All-American college women's basketball players
Centers (basketball)
Charlotte Sting players
Mozambican expatriate basketball people in the United States
Los Angeles Sparks draft picks
Los Angeles Sparks players
Mozambican expatriate basketball people in Spain
Mozambican expatriate sportspeople in the United States
Mozambican women's basketball players
Old Dominion Monarchs women's basketball players
Orlando Miracle players
San Jose Lasers players
Tarbes Gespe Bigorre players